Grzegorz Zimniewicz (born 13 October 1991) is a Polish athlete competing in sprinting events. He represented his country in the 4 × 100 metres relay at the 2013 World Championships without qualifying for the final.

International competitions

1Disqualified in the semifinals

2Did not finish in the semifinals

Personal bests
Outdoor
100 metres – 10.31 (+0.8 m/s, Łódź 2013)
200 metres – 21.08 (-0.6 m/s, Zielona Góra 2010)
Indoor
60 metres – 6.66 (Spała 2014)

References

1991 births
Living people
People from Leszno
Polish male sprinters
World Athletics Championships athletes for Poland
Sportspeople from Greater Poland Voivodeship
Universiade medalists in athletics (track and field)
Universiade silver medalists for Poland
Medalists at the 2015 Summer Universiade
21st-century Polish people